This list of botanical gardens and arboretums in Minnesota is intended to include all significant botanical gardens and arboretums in the U.S. state of Minnesota.

See also
List of botanical gardens and arboretums in the United States

References 

 
Arboreta in Minnesota
botanical gardens and arboretums in Minnesota